Gynacantha is a genus of dragonflies in the family Aeshnidae.
The females have two prominent spines under the last abdominal segment. This gives the genus name (from Greek female and thorn) and the common name two-spined darners; they are also known as duskhawkers.

Species
The genus Gynacantha includes the following species:

 Gynacantha adela 
 Gynacantha africana  - Giant Duskhawker
 Gynacantha albistyla 
 Gynacantha alcathoe 
 Gynacantha apiaensis 
 Gynacantha apicalis 
 Gynacantha arnaudi 
 Gynacantha arsinoe 
 Gynacantha arthuri 
 Gynacantha auricularis 
 Gynacantha bainbriggei 
 Gynacantha bartai 
 Gynacantha basiguttata 
 Gynacantha bayadera  
 Gynacantha bifida 
 Gynacantha biharica 
 Gynacantha bispina 
 Gynacantha bullata  - Black-kneed Duskhawker
 Gynacantha burmana 
 Gynacantha calliope 
 Gynacantha calypso 
 Gynacantha cattienensis 
 Gynacantha caudata 
 Gynacantha chaplini 
 Gynacantha chelifera 
 Gynacantha comorensis 
 Gynacantha constricta 
 Gynacantha convergens 
 Gynacantha corbeti 
 Gynacantha croceipennis 
 Gynacantha cylindrata  - Greater girdled Duskhawker
 Gynacantha demeter 
 Gynacantha dobsoni  – lesser duskhawker
 Gynacantha dohrni 
 Gynacantha dravida 
 Gynacantha ereagris 
 Gynacantha francesca 
 Gynacantha furcata 
 Gynacantha gracilis 
 Gynacantha helenga 
 Gynacantha hova 
 Gynacantha hyalina 
 Gynacantha immaculifrons  - Pale Duskhawker
 Gynacantha incisura 
 Gynacantha interioris 
 Gynacantha japonica 
 Gynacantha jessei 
 Gynacantha khasiaca 
 Gynacantha kirbyi  – slender duskhawker
 Gynacantha klagesi 
 Gynacantha laticeps 
 Gynacantha limbalis 
 Gynacantha litoralis 
 Gynacantha maclachlani 
 Gynacantha malgassica 
 Gynacantha manderica  – little duskhawker
 Gynacantha membranalis 
 Gynacantha mexicana  – bar-sided darner
 Gynacantha mocsaryi  – paddle-tipped duskhawker
 Gynacantha musa 
 Gynacantha nausicaa 
 Gynacantha nervosa  – twilight darner
 Gynacantha nigeriensis  – yellow-legged duskhawker
 Gynacantha nourlangie  – cave duskhawker
 Gynacantha odoneli 
 Gynacantha pasiphae 
 Gynacantha penelope 
 Gynacantha phaeomeria 
 Gynacantha radama 
 Gynacantha rammohani 
 Gynacantha remartinia 
 Gynacantha risi 
 Gynacantha rolandmuelleri 
 Gynacantha rosenbergi  – grey duskhawker
 Gynacantha rotundata 
 Gynacantha ryukyuensis 
 Gynacantha saltatrix 
 Gynacantha sextans  - Dark-rayed Duskhawker
 Gynacantha stenoptera 
 Gynacantha stevensoni 
 Gynacantha stylata 
 Gynacantha subinterrupta 
 Gynacantha tenuis 
 Gynacantha tibiata 
 Gynacantha usambarica  – Usambara duskhawker
 Gynacantha vargasi 
 Gynacantha vesiculata 
 Gynacantha villosa  – hairy duskhawker

References

Aeshnidae
Anisoptera genera
Odonata of Australia
Odonata of Oceania
Taxa named by Jules Pierre Rambur
Taxonomy articles created by Polbot
Odonata of Asia